Richard Hottoft (c1575-1641) was rector of St Mary's, Oldswinford in Worcestershire.

History
Hottoft was educated at Trinity College, Cambridge, matriculating c 1593.  He was awarded his BA (1596/7) and his MA in 1600.  He was instituted twice as rector by Gervase Babington. Bishop of Worcester.  On 29 March 1602 he was instituted with his patron being given as Meriel Lyttelton widow of John Lyttelton and guardian of her son, Thomas Lyttelton, a minor. Hottoft was instituted for a second time on 1 May 1602 with the patron given as Queen Elizabeth I.

As rector, he was a trustee of the Stourbridge almshouses.   He died in 1641  and his will included a gift of £10 to the poor of the parish of Oldswinford.

Hottoft and his wife, Joyce, owned land locally including at Eccleshall and Stourbridge, Bedcote and Oldswinford.

References

1641 deaths
17th-century English Anglican priests
1575 births